Saving Silverman (internationally titled Evil Woman) is a 2001 American comedy film directed by Dennis Dugan and starring Jason Biggs, Steve Zahn, Jack Black and Amanda Peet. Neil Diamond has a cameo role playing himself. In the film, Darren Silverman's longtime friends try to save him from marrying his controlling new girlfriend, whose behavior threatens the friends, their band, and Darren's chance at happiness with his lifelong true love.

The film was remade in Telugu as Thotti Gang in 2002 and Hindi as De Taali in 2008.

Plot
Darren Silverman, Wayne LeFessier, and J.D. McNugent, best friends since fifth grade and Neil Diamond fans throughout, form a Neil Diamond tribute band called "Diamonds in the Rough".

Through a chance encounter in a local bar after a band gig, Darren meets Judith Fessbeggler, a beautiful but domineering psychologist who shows signs of being emotionally abusive. Six weeks into their relationship, Darren asks her if they could finally have sex, but Judith refuses until marriage. She suggests non-penetrative sex instead, so Darren gets nothing but a sore jaw.

Judith isolates Darren from his friends, demands that he quit the band, receive humiliating medical procedures, and attend relationship counseling under her care. Wayne and J.D. decide to save Darren from her by attempting to bribe her, arm wrestle her, and finally shock her with faked photographs of Darren cheating, all to no avail.

The friends, undaunted, try to reunite Darren with his "one and only", Sandy Perkus, when she returns to Seattle before she takes her final vows as a nun. When Darren and Judith announce their engagement, Wayne and J.D. kidnap her. However, she discovers the identity of her captors, and the duo are convinced they cannot let her go.

When they visit Coach Norton in jail (who accidentally killed a referee with a football signal pole in a fit of rage) he suggests they just kill her. The pair attempt to shoot Judith, but end up deciding against it. Sandy's feelings for Darren are reawakened, but their attempted date is ruined by his preoccupation with Judith. Sandy, disheartened, returns to the convent, but Darren snaps out of it and runs the 30 miles there to win her back.

Chained to an engine block in Wayne's garage, Judith helps J.D. realize he is gay. She knocks him unconscious to steal his keys and escape, only to be tranquilized by Wayne. Returned to the garage, Judith seduces him into releasing one of her hands, so she escapes again. She runs to Darren's house in time to see him kiss Sandy, but shames him into confessing his engagement to her. Sandy, disappointed, returns to the convent again.

Darren has Wayne and J.D. arrested. Escaping from jail with Coach Norton's help, J.D. and Wayne rush to the convent on the brink of Sandy's final vows as a nun. Convincing her that Darren still loves her, they then kidnap Neil Diamond to help Darren and Sandy reunite.

At the wedding, Neil stalls the proceedings with the song "Hello Again" while Darren and Sandy reunite. Wayne and Judith (the latter being furious that her wedding is ruined) beat each other up (as love play) and J.D. arrives holding Coach in his arms, who coincidentally reveals to J.D. that he too is gay. The couples then wed on stage at Neil Diamond's concert; Darren to Sandy, Wayne to Judith, and J.D. to Coach.

Cast
 Jason Biggs as Darren Silverman
 Steve Zahn as Wayne Lefessier
 Jack Black as J.D. McNugent
 Amanda Peet as Judith Fessbeggler
 Amanda Detmer as Sandy Perkus
 R. Lee Ermey as Coach Norton
 Neil Diamond as himself
 Kyle Gass as Bar guy
 Christopher Logan as Vagee, Darren’s band replacement
 Jared Van Snellenberg as Belston
 Dennis Dugan as referee (uncredited)

Production
This film falls within a cross-genre film type from the late 1990s and early 2000s in which grooms are saved, or nearly saved, from distasteful marriage. Cast member Jason Biggs said the film is based on "a universal problem" of girlfriends who control who their partners are friends with.

Saving Silverman was filmed in Vancouver, British Columbia from June 7 to August 2000 at a cost of US$22 million. Neil Diamond said humorously that "I was dragged into this project kicking and screaming." He wrote and composed a new song, "I Believe in Happy Endings", for the film.

Reception
Saving Silverman has a score of 19% (an average rating of 3.7 out of 10 based on 102 reviews) on review aggregator Rotten Tomatoes. Its critical consensus states, "Dragged down by a plot lacking any sense of logic and obnoxious, unsympathetic characters, this comedy is more crude and mean-spirited than funny." Metacritic gives it an average score of 22% based on 29 reviews, indicating "generally unfavorable reviews".

The film opened at No. 3 at the North American box office making US$7.4million in its opening weekend. The film grossed a domestic total of $19,402,030 and $26,086,706 worldwide from a $22 million budget. It opened behind The Wedding Planner and Hannibal, which opened at the top spot.

Home media

Saving Silverman was released in two versions on home video - the PG-13 version that had been released in theaters, and the original R rated cut. The differences between the two versions are mostly dialogue changes and small additions to certain scenes, although two new scenes do appear, with some other scenes in the movie swapped around to compensate for the longer run time. A Blu-ray version was finally released through Mill Creek Entertainment on July 13, 2021 in a bare-bones package that contained no bonus features from the earlier DVD releases. Additionally, this format's packaging claims the film is PG-13, but actually contains the R-rated cut of the movie.

References

External links

 
 

2001 films
2001 black comedy films
2000s buddy comedy films
2001 LGBT-related films
American black comedy films
American buddy comedy films
American LGBT-related films
Columbia Pictures films
2000s English-language films
Films set in Seattle
Films set in Washington (state)
Films shot in Vancouver
Films directed by Dennis Dugan
LGBT-related black comedy films
Village Roadshow Pictures films
Original Film films
2001 comedy films
2000s American films